Syktyvkar is the capital city of the Komi Republic, Russia.

Syktyvkar may also refer to:
Syktyvkar Urban Okrug, a municipal formation which the city of republic significance of Syktyvkar in the Komi Republic, Russia is incorporated as
Syktyvkar Airport, an airport in the Komi Republic, Russia
Syktyvkar Southwest, an unfinished and abandoned airport in the Komi Republic, Russia